Iram Parveen Bilal is a Pakistani-American filmmaker, activist and entrepreneur. In 2020, her latest feature film I'll Meet You There debuted at South By Southwest (SXSW) in narrative competition.

Early life
Bilal was raised in Pakistan, and came to the US to study at the California Institute of Technology. She graduated with her B.S, honors, in Environmental Science Engineering. Upon graduating, Bilal was awarded a unique opportunity with the Thomas J. Watson Fellowship, a travel fellowship grant that took her around the world.

She was the inspiration behind Kareena Kapoor’s character name in the movie Agent Vinod.

Career

Filmmaker
Her latest film, I'll Meet You There, is a family drama about a Muslim cop and his teenage ballerina daughter. The project was a Film Independent writer/director lab project and 1 of 10 out of thousands selected to compete in the SXSW 2020 grand jury. It further went on to compete at the Bentonville Film Festival as well.

Bilal was also 1 of 15 directors invited to Cinefondation's L'Atelier at Cannes 2019 for her feature project WAKHRI (ONE OF A KIND), based on a social media star in Pakistan.

Her previous film Josh: Independence Through Unity is a mystery thriller set in Karachi that follows an upper-class woman who becomes determined to find out what happened to her missing caretaker. Her journey takes her to a nearby village run by a feudal lord, and in the process endangers herself and others. The story tackles themes of feudalism, youth movements, poverty, and the challenges of trying to do good amidst social unrest. Josh was Pakistan's first film to be on Netflix and in the permanent selection at the US Library of Congress.

Bilal was hired to direct the live action adaptation of the wildly popular The PhD comics in 2015. That led to her second feature: The PhD Movie: Still in Grad School. She is a Thomas J Watson, Women In Film, Film Independent and CAPE fellow and an active member of the Alliance of Women Directors and Film Fatales, both organizations vested for fair representation of female directors in the entertainment industry.

Other feature projects in development have received attention by IFP, The academy's Nicholl Writing Fellowship, Mumbai Sankalan Lab, Film Independent and Women In Film. Prominent awards and honors include the Thomas J. Watson Fellowship, Stark Special Project Scholarship, Mabel Beckman Leadership Award, Paul Studenski Fellowship and the Dean's Cup. In March 2013, she was asked to give a TedX talk entitled "Get Uncomfortable Now" at Caltech.

Qalambaaz
In 2014 Bilal initiated Qalambaaz, a platform that provides mentors and nurtures the growth of screenplay writers through competition. The screenplay writing competition was recently launched at The Second Floor (T2F) under Bilal's banner Parveen Shah Productions. Bilal clarifies that the platform does not promise funding for filmmakers, but guarantees a final product that can be sold as a possible feature film production.

Filmography

References

External links 
 
 

American women film directors
American women screenwriters
Film producers from California
Living people
American women film producers
American film producers
American women television directors
American television directors
Writers from Los Angeles
Year of birth missing (living people)
Pakistani emigrants to the United States
Film directors from Los Angeles
Screenwriters from California
21st-century American women